The Medal for Bravery (Bronze) (Chinese: 銅英勇勳章, MBB) is the third Medal for Bravery rank in the honours system of Hong Kong.  It is awarded for exemplary acts of gallantry of a lesser standard then the Medal for Bravery (Silver).  It was created in 1997 to replace the British honours system after the transfer of sovereignty to the People's Republic of China and the establishment of the Hong Kong Special Administrative Region (HKSAR).

List of awardees

1998
 Mr Ho Fung-cheung, MBB 
 Mr Sum Kwong-ho, MBB 
 Capt. Trevor Keith Marshall, MBB 
 Capt. Tang Sing-tung, Ardis, MBB

1999
 Mr Andrew Grant McCormack, MBB 
 Mr Tsang Siu-ping, MBB 
 Miss Kwong Lai-yin, MBB

2000
 Mr Wong Chi-fai, MBB 
 Captain Barry Kevin Collier, MBB 
 Mr Chan Man-tik, MBB 
 Mr Cheng Ka-wah, MBB 
 Mr Hui Chun-kit, Andy, MBB 
 Mr Mak King-yeung, MBB 
 Mr Fung Tai-kwong, MBB 
 Mr Lo Shu-tsun, MBB

2001
 Ms Wong Suk-wah, MBB 
 Ms Yeung Wai-kuen, MBB 
 Mr Kwong Kwan-ming, MBB

2003
 Captain Tang Pui-tung, MBB 
 Captain Chan Ka-to, MBB 
 Mr Fung Yap-wing, MBB 
 Mr Mau Yuk-fung, MBB

2004
 Captain Tang Sing-tung, Ardis, MBB
 Mr Choi Chiu-ming, Jimmy, MBB, GMSM
 Mr Li Kin-cheung, Edward, MBB
 Captain Wong Chun-pong, MBB
 Captain Chan Chi-pui, Michael, MBB
 Mr Tsang Chung-bun, MBB
 Mr Yeung Kwong-mo, MBB

2007
 Mr Li Kin-cheung, Edward, MBB 
 Mr Cheng Ka-wah, MBB 
 Mr Ng Wai-cheong, MBB 
 Captain Lee Chun-chi, George, MBB
 Mr Li Kwok-leung, Cally, MBB 
 Captain Lam Tak-kan, Dickens, MBB
 Mr Lam Lung-kwan, MBB 
 Captain Yuen Yiu-keung, MBB 
 Captain Leung Man-chiu, Eric, MBB 
 Captain Wong Yiu-hong, MBB

2008
 Mr Cheung Wah-yuk, MBB

2009
Mr Chan Shu-kei, Marcus, MBB

2010-2014 recipients not yet noted

2015
 Mr Lui Pang-hung, MBB
 Mr Tsang Chi-ho, MBB

2016 

 Mr. CHU Wai-man, MBB
 Mr. NG Chi-hung, MBB
 Mr. CHOW Wai-hong, MBB
 Mr. CHAN Chun-yin, MBB
 Mr. TANG Peng-seng, MBB
 Mr. CHAN Ho-fung, MBB
 Mr. CHAN Hin-kei, MBB

2017 

 Mr. LEUNG Wai-kong, MBB
 Mr. FONG Chai-chuen, MBB
 Mr. LI Wai-ming, MBB
 Mr. CHEUNG Kam-chuen, MBB
 Mr. LEUNG King-yin, MBB
 Mr. CHEN Yong-lun, MBB
 Mr. YEUNG Siu-fung, MBB
 Mr. LIU Wong-chung, MBB
 Mr. SO Wing-kwan, MBB

2018 

 Mr. TSANG Chi-ho, MBB
 Captain WONG Yiu-hong, MBB
 Mr. FOK Wai-fung, MBB, GMSM
 Mr. LI Ngai, MBB
 Mr. LEE Shek-hei, Brian, MBB
 Mr. LIU Kwai-hing, MBB
 Mr. CHOY Chak-man, MBB
 Mr. Zachary Brian ROLFE, MBB

2019 

 Mr. LEE Kwun-fat, MBB
 Mr. WOO Kwan-kuen, MBB
 Mr. CHEUNG Man-ho, MBB
 Mr. CHEUNG Ka-wo, MBB
 Mr. KWOK Kar-wo, MBB
 Mr. CHUM Man-kit, MBB
 Mr. CHENG Yui-kwok, Adam, MBB

2020 

 Mr. MAN Kwun-san, MBB
 Mr. WU Sui-kit, MBB
 Mr. WAI Tsz-yin, MBB
 Mr. MA Kai-on, MBB
 Mr. CHEUNG Lik-hang, MBB
 Mr. LEUNG Kai-yip, Keith, MBB
 Mr. TSANG Chi-on, MBB
 Mr. WONG Ka-lun, MBB

2021 

 Mr. HO Sze-chun, MBB
 Mr. NG Hoi-kin, MBB
 Mr. LEUNG Chi-hang, Janson, MBB
 Mr. CHONG Siu-lung, MBB

References

Lists of Hong Kong people
Civil awards and decorations of Hong Kong
Awards established in 1997